The 1877 Rhode Island gubernatorial election was held on April 4, 1877. Republican nominee Charles C. Van Zandt defeated Democratic nominee Jerothmul B. Barnaby with 50.93% of the vote.

General election

Candidates
Major party candidates
Charles C. Van Zandt, Republican
 Jerothmul B. Barnaby, Democratic 

Other candidates
William Foster Jr., Greenback

Results

References

1877
Rhode Island
Gubernatorial